The Institute of Foreign Languages (IFL) is an institute under the Royal University of Phnom Penh Campus. It consists of the department of Chinese, English, French, Japanese, Korean, Thai, and International Studies.

See also 
 List of universities in Cambodia
 Royal University of Phnom Penh

Notes

References

External links 
 Official Website of IFL
Language Academia

Universities and colleges in Cambodia
Schools in Phnom Penh
Language schools